Roomful of Blues is an American blues and swing revival big band based in Rhode Island. With a recording career that spans over 50 years, they have toured worldwide and recorded many albums.  Roomful of Blues, according to the Chicago Sun-Times, "Swagger, sway and swing with energy and precision".  Since 1967, the group’s blend of swing, rock and roll, jump blues, boogie-woogie and soul has earned it five Grammy Award nominations and many other accolades, including seven Blues Music Awards (with a victory as Blues Band Of The Year in 2005). Billboard called the band "a tour de force of horn-fried blues…Roomful is so tight and so right." The Down Beat International Critics Poll has twice selected Roomful of Blues as Best Blues Band.

Roomful of Blues is currently an eight-piece unit led by guitarist Chris Vachon and featuring long-time tenor and alto sax player Rich Lataille.  In 2010, singer Phil Pemberton took over the vocal duties, replacing Dave Howard. Recent members are trumpeter Carl Gerhard, bassist John Turner and drummer Chris Rivelli, joining long-time member baritone and tenor saxophonist Mark Earley. Keyboardist Travis Colby left the band at the end of 2012 to continue his music career in a different direction and Rusty Scott is now on keyboards.  Over the years there have been at least 48 Roomful of Blues members.

Career
Roomful of Blues was born in Westerly, Rhode Island, United States, in 1967 when guitarist Duke Robillard and pianist Al Copley started a band that played tough, no-holds-barred Chicago blues.  They soon began exploring the swinging, jumping blues, R&B and jazz of the 1940s and 1950s, and added a horn section (including Rich Lataille) in 1970. They established a devoted fan base in New England. In 1974, they performed with Count Basie, and a few years later songwriter Doc Pomus helped them land their first record deal, and produced their debut with co-producer Joel Dorn. In 1977, Roomful of Blues’ self-titled debut album on Island Records (reissued on Hyena Records as The First Album) brought them to national attention.

Founding member Duke Robillard left the band in 1980, and guitarist Ronnie Earl replaced him. Singer Lou Ann Barton joined the band at this time, sharing vocals with sax man Greg Piccolo. By now the band was touring nationally, attracting bigger and bigger crowds. Roomful recorded the Hot Little Mama for their own Blue Flame label and two successful albums for the Varrick label during the 1980s. In 1994, they released Dance All Night, their first featuring guitarist Chris Vachon (who joined the band in 1990) and harpist/vocalist Sugar Ray Norcia. Their 1995 album, the Grammy-nominated Turn It On! Turn It Up!, a mix of big band swing and rock and roll, brought the band its greatest radio and sales success to date. 1997 saw a sizable turnover in personnel, with five members departing; vocalist/harpist Sugar Ray Norcia, keyboardist Matt McCabe, bassist "Doc" Grace, baritone saxophonist Doug "Mr. Low" James, and trombonist Carl Querfurth left and were replaced by, respectively, vocalist McKinley "Mac" Odom, keyboardist Al Weisman, bassist Marty Ballou, baritone saxist Kevin May, and trombonist/bass trombonist John Wolf. This edition of Roomful released There Goes the Neighborhood on Rounder subsidiary Bullseye Blues in 1998. Roomful of Blues joined Chicago-based Alligator Records with the Grammy-nominated That’s Right! in 2003, followed by Standing Room Only in 2005, Raisin’ A Ruckus in 2008, Hook, Line and Sinker in 2011 and 45 Live! in 2013. Down Beat described Standing Room Only as “bold, brassy and highly danceable jump blues with contemporary energy and sophistication...swings with a vengeance.”

In addition to their band recordings, Roomful of Blues often backed musicians like Jimmy Witherspoon, Jimmy McCracklin, Roy Brown, Joe Turner, Eddie “Cleanhead” Vinson and Earl King — stars of the 1940s and 1950s jump blues scene. Roomful recorded albums with Turner, Vinson and King during the 1980s, and all three recordings received Grammy nominations. They played with rocker Pat Benatar on her 1991 blues album True Love. The Roomful Horns backed many other artists as well, including Canadian star Colin James on his double platinum album (in Canada), Colin James and the Little Big Band, and Stevie Ray Vaughan on his 1984 Live At Carnegie Hall album on Epic.

Over the years Roomful of Blues has played countless gigs and many major festivals, including The San Francisco Blues Festival, The King Biscuit Blues Festival, The  Beale Street Music Festival, Blues On The Fox, Illinois Blues Festival, Kansas City Blues Festival, Monterey Blues Festival, Santa Cruz Blues Festival, and overseas at The North Sea Jazz Festival, The Stockholm Jazz Festival, The Montreux Jazz Festival, Notodden Festival and the Belgian Rhythm & Blues Festival. They have gigged with blues stars ranging from B.B. King, Otis Rush and Stevie Ray Vaughan to rockers Eric Clapton and Carlos Santana. The band has toured virtually non-stop, hitting cities from coast to coast, and traveling abroad to Spain, Italy, France, Portugal, Switzerland, Turkey and Russia.

Personnel
Throughout four decades of continuous touring and recording, the band's line-up has experienced many changes. It is said that more than 50 musicians have played in the band. Some of them have achieved a successful solo career. Of note, Porky Cohen, whose career began in the 1940s and included playing in the bands of Charlie Barnet, Artie Shaw, Lucky Millinder, Tommy Dorsey and others, was in the band. Rich Lataille, alto and tenor saxophone, is the only remaining member from the original line-up.

Current members
 Rich Lataille – tenor and alto saxophone (1970–present)
 Chris Vachon – guitar (1990–present)
 Phil Pemberton – vocal (2010–present)
 Rusty Scott – piano and Hammond organ (2012–present)
 John Turner – upright bass and bass guitar
 Mike Coffey – drums
 Carl Gerhard – trumpet
 Alek Razdan – baritone and tenor saxophone

Former members
Listed alphabetically. This is a partial list.
 Chris Anzalone
 Marty Ballou – bass
 Lou Ann Barton – vocal (early 1980s)
 Al Basile – trumpet and cornet
 Junior Brantley – keyboards
 Fran Christina – drums
 Porky Cohen – trombone (deceased)
 Travis Colby – piano and Hammond organ (20??–2012)
 Al Copley – piano (1967–1984)
 Jason Corbiere – drums
 Norman Daley – baritone sax
 Forest Doran – bass
 Mark DuFresne – vocal and harmonica
 Ronnie Earl – guitar (1980–1988)
 Mark Earley – baritone sax and tenor sax
 Bob Enos – trumpet (deceased)
 Dimitri Gorodestky – bass
 Ken "Doc" Grace – bass
 Brad Hallen – bass
 Dave Howard – vocal (20??–2010)
 Preston Hubbard – bass 
 Fred Jackson – trumpet
 Doug "Mr. Low" James – baritone saxophone
 Tommy K. – guitar
 Ron Levy – piano and Hammond organ (1983–1987)
 Ephraim Lowell – drums
 Kevin May – baritone sax
 Matt McCabe – piano
 Rory MacLeod – bass (1985-1987)  
 Danny Motta – trumpet
 Sugar Ray Norcia – vocal and harmonica (1991–1998)
 Mac Odom – vocal
 Edward Parnigoni, Jr. – bass
 Larry Peduzzi – bass
 George Peterle – guitar
 Greg Piccolo – vocal and tenor sax
 Carl Querfurth – trombone and producer
 Bryan "Frankie" Rizzuto – upright bass, electric bass
 Duke Robillard – vocal and guitar (1967–1980)
 John Rossi – drums (1970–1998)
 Curtis Salgado – vocal (1984–1986)
 Mark Stevens – piano and Hammond organ
 Paul Tomasello – bass and vocal
 Hank Walther – piano and Hammond organ
 Mike Warner – drums
 Albert Weisman – piano and Hammond organ
 Jimmy Wimpfheimer – bass
 John Wolf – trombone and bass trombone
 Doug Woolverton – trumpet

Discography

Studio albums
 1977 Roomful of Blues [reissued as The First Album] (Island; Varrick [1988]; 32 Records [1996]; Hyena [2003])
 1979 Let's Have a Party (Antilles; Room-Tone RT-102 [2004])
 1981 Hot Little Mama! (Blue Flame; Ace; Varrick [1985])
 1982 Eddie "Cleanhead" Vinson & Roomful of Blues (by Eddie "Cleanhead" Vinson) (Muse)
 1983 Blues Train (by Big Joe Turner) (Muse; Rockbeat) - with special guest: Dr. John
 1984 Dressed Up To Get Messed Up (Varrick; Demon)
 1986 Glazed (by Earl King) (Black Top)
 1991 True Love (by Pat Benatar) (Chrysalis) - Benatar's jump blues album featuring 'The Roomful Horns' with her band: Neil Giraldo, Chuck Domanico, Myron Grombacher, Charlie Giordano
 1994 Dance All Night (Bullseye Blues)
 1995 Turn It On! Turn It Up! (Bullseye Blues)
 1996 Rhythm & Bones (by Porky Cohen) (Bullseye Blues)
 1997 Under One Roof (Bullseye Blues)
 1997 Roomful of Christmas (Bullseye Blues)
 1998 There Goes the Neighborhood (Bullseye Blues)
 2001 Watch You When You Go (Bullseye Blues)	
 2003 That's Right! (Alligator)
 2005 Standing Room Only (Alligator)
 2008 Raisin' a Ruckus (Alligator)
 2011 Hook, Line & Sinker (Alligator)
 2020 In a Roomful of Blues (Alligator)

Live albums
 1987 Live at Lupo's Heartbreak Hotel (Varrick; Demon)
 2002 Live at Wolf Trap (Room-Tone RT-101 [currently out-of-print])
 2013 45 Live! (Alligator) - recorded live at 'The Ocean Mist'

Compilation albums
 1999 Swingin' & Jumpin'  (1979–1983 recordings) (32 Records)
 2000 The Blues'll Make You Happy Too (1981–1998 recordings) (Rounder)
 2009 Essential Recordings: Jump Blues Classics (Perfect 10 Series: Best of Rounder Records) (Rounder)

References

External links
 Official website

American blues musical groups
Black Top Records artists
Alligator Records artists
Muse Records artists
Island Records artists
Musical groups established in 1967
Jump blues musicians
Contemporary blues musicians
Swing revival ensembles